Austroaeschna cooloola is a species of large dragonfly in the family Telephlebiidae, 
known as the Wallum darner. 
It has been found in south-eastern Queensland, Australia, where it inhabits sandy and densely vegetated streams.

Austroaeschna cooloola is a dark brown to black dragonfly with blue markings. It appears similar to the more widespread unicorn darner, Austroaeschna unicornis, and the tropical unicorn darner, Austroaeschna speciosa, found near Cairns in Far North Queensland.

Gallery

See also
List of dragonflies of Australia

References

Telephlebiidae
Odonata of Australia
Endemic fauna of Australia
Taxa named by Günther Theischinger
Insects described in 1991